Kenneth G. Libbrecht (born June, 1958) is a professor of physics and department chairman at the California Institute of Technology.

Biography
Libbrecht received a B.S. in physics at Caltech in 1980. He was originally trained as a solar astronomer, studying under Robert Dicke at Princeton University and received his Ph.D. in 1984. However, much of his recent research has focused on the properties of ice crystals, particularly the structure of snowflakes. In addition to his professional papers, he has published several popular books illustrating the variety of snowflake forms:
The Snowflake: Winter's Secret Beauty (with Patricia Rasmussen photography)
Ken Libbrecht's Field Guide to Snowflakes
The Little Book of Snowflakes
The Art of the Snowflake: A Photographic Album

Libbrecht won the 2004 National Outdoor Book Award (Nature & Environment category) for The Snowflake. Libbrecht was a scientific consultant on snowflakes for the 2013 Film Frozen.

Four of Libbrecht's snowflake pictures were selected by the United States Postal Service as designs for stamps for the 2006 winter holiday season, with a total printing of approximately 3 billion stamps. In 2010, Libbrecht was the recipient of the Lennart Nilsson Award. In conjunction with the award, the Swedish postal service, PostNord, released a series of stamps featuring some of his images of snowflakes.

References

External links 
 Snowflakes and Snow Crystals (Website created and maintained by Dr. Libbrecht)

Living people
21st-century American physicists
Experimental physicists
American astronomers
American stamp designers
Princeton University alumni
California Institute of Technology faculty
1958 births